Philipp is an unincorporated community in southern Tallahatchie County, Mississippi, United States, along Mississippi Highway 8. Although Philipp is an unincorporated community, it has a post office with a ZIP code of 38950.

History
The community was founded by Emanuel L. Philipp (later Governor of Wisconsin) when he was the manager of a lumber company from 1894 to 1902 in Mississippi.

Education
It is zoned to the West Tallahatchie School District. The local schools for West Tallahatchie are R. H. Bearden Elementary School and West Tallahatchie High School.

At one time the Philipp Consolidated School was located in the community. In 1957 the West Tallahatchie district announced that the property was for sale.

At a later point Black Bayou Elementary School in Glendora served southern parts of the West Tallahatchie district. The district decided to close Black Bayou in 1998. Previously West District Middle School (now Bearden) served as a middle school for the West Tallahatchie area.

Coahoma Community College is the designated community college for Tallahatchie County.

References

Unincorporated communities in Tallahatchie County, Mississippi
Unincorporated communities in Mississippi